Agent J (usually called J), originally James Darrell Edwards III, is one of the two protagonists of the Men in Black film series. Born October 19, 1965, Jay is an agent of the MiB, recruited by Agent K. He is energetic, and tries to bring life and emotion back to the bland organization. He is portrayed by Will Smith in the Men in Black film franchise, as well as in the amusement park ride Men in Black: Alien Attack at Universal Studios Florida. He is voiced by Keith Diamond in the animated series.

Biography

Early life
Not much is known about the life of J (or James Darrel Edwards III) prior to being recruited into Men in Black. His appearance as a small child in 1969 in Men in Black 3 would place the year of his birth as 1965. His father, United States Army Colonel James Darrell Edwards II, was working security at Kennedy Space Center for the Apollo 11 launch, when he was murdered by the alien Boris the Animal after assisting Agent K in stopping a chain of events that would have led to K's death and a large-scale invasion of Earth forty years later. Nothing else is known about the preceding twenty-eight years except that James became a member of the New York City Police Department. J is said to be a big fan of video games and rap music. A line of dialogue from Men in Black II suggests he owned a Game Boy.

Men in Black

Agent J's Men in Black career starts out when, as Officer Edwards III, he runs down a swift, wall-climbing alien on foot. When Men in Black Agent K notices his potential, he recruits J into the organization (within the continuity of the series, the events of Men in Black 3 imply that K recognized J from their meeting in the 60s). At first, J is suspicious, but he decides to join. He is registered as Agent J and his energetic, enthusiastic attitude brings humor to a bland organization. J is not fond of K's diminutive references to him (son, sport, slick, kid, etc.), but gets used to it. In his various featured adventures, he encounters Frank the Pug, the dog who is really an alien; finds out that Jeebs, a previously shown pawn store owner, is actually an alien, not just a buyer of stolen goods from chain snatchers like he originally thought when he was a detective; and delivers a baby squid-like alien. Their first official mission is to stop an alien bug from leaving Earth with a tiny galaxy before the Arquillians (who demand the return of the galaxy) disintegrate the planet. During the final confrontation with the bug, K is swallowed by it in an attempt to get his gun back, leaving J to keep him on Earth. When he starts squishing cockroaches, the bug confronts him, but before it can attack him, K shoots it from the inside. The bug was finally killed by Dr. Laurel Weaver (Linda Fiorentino), a morgue worker whom the bug kidnapped and J's love interest. When K requests to be neuralyzed (a memory-wiping procedure) to retire, J fulfills the request and his new partner is Laurel, who becomes known as Agent L.

Men in Black: The Series
Throughout the series, Agent J is continually treated like a rookie. For example, he is rarely allowed to drive an official Men in Black Car, many secrets are kept from him, they don't let him handle certain equipment, among other things. In addition to these things, he remains the partner of Agent K. Into the animated series, J makes his issued weapon, the "Noisy Cricket", less noisy by attaching a Silencer to it.

Men in Black II
At some point between the first and second film, L goes back to her morgue career, and J has gained a reputation for neuralyzing all of his successors for, in his opinion, unsuitability to work at Men in Black. At the beginning of the film, he neuralyzes his new partner Agent T because he forces T to admit that he joined the agency to be a hero, something that is fundamentally impossible in the Men in Black due to the secretive nature of the organization. This has earned the annoyance of his superior, Zed, who confronts J and tells him he needs to stop neuralyzing his partners. Despite these shortcomings however, he has developed into one of the most highly regarded agents within MIB. Nevertheless, when he is sent to get K back to face a new threat to which only he had details of locked away in his mind, Zed assigns Frank the Pug to be J's temporary partner. J investigates a murder at a local pizza joint committed by Serleena, the Kylothian queen who has arrived to find the Light of Zartha after destroying several planets. During the investigation, he meets and falls in love with an employee named Laura Vasquez. Despite the organization's policy, J does not neuralyze her. J then heads to find Kevin Brown (aka Agent K) who holds the key to finding the Light of Zartha and stopping Serleena before she could get her hands on the Light. When K is de-neuralyzed, J is once again the rookie, but for revenge, J gives K the Noisy Cricket (the tiny gun that K saddled him with in the first film). The duo discover the light is Laura, heir to the throne of Zartha (implied to be K's daughter due to his relationship with her mother) and J reluctantly allows her to fulfill her destiny as he and K finally destroy Serleena for good.

During the film, J has a particular enmity with the alien criminal known as Jara, whom J stopped from stealing the Earth's ozone layer.

Men in Black 3
In the third film, J has become a well-respected, Rank "Men in Black" agent in the year 2012. He continues to work with K but is frustrated by K keeping secrets from him, which is supposedly done for his own good. The escaped alien criminal Boris the Animal time-travels back to 1969 and murders a young K, which could result in the end of the world as K was no longer present to establish a force field that could permanently protect Earth from invasion by the Boglodites (Boris' species).

J tracked the time jump device owner and showed him the invasion, as a reason to save K. Thanks to "being there" when the major moment in history changed (the installation of the ArcNet), J was able to retain all memory of K. J travels back to 1969 to save K, despite being hampered by his lack of knowledge of K's personal life or the specific details of the case that killed him. J then traveled back to 1969, where he meets the younger K. To keep the present unchanged by Boris's interference, J advises K to kill the Boglodite instead of arresting him as in the original timeline. J is also stunned to discover that K's past self is much more open and friendly than his present version. With the help of an alien named Griffin and a US Army Colonel that Griffin gets to help them, J and K reach the Apollo 11 launch site and separately fight Boris from 2012 and Boris in 1969 to launch the ArcNet. Using his time travel device, J defeats the elder Boris and ensures the restoration of the timeline.

Future Boris is killed by Apollo 11's exhaust and the ArcNet is successfully deployed, but before he can return to the future, J witnesses the past Boris murdering the colonel that had helped them. K kills the younger Boris and J discovers to his shock that the colonel was his own father when his past self appears. J witnesses K comfort his past self and then neuralyzes him and tell the young James that his father is a hero. Finally understanding what K was trying to protect him from and seeing K had been watching over him, J returns to the present where he indicates his knowledge of what happened to K and thanks him for watching out for him. K tells him it has been his privilege to watch out for J all of these years, and the duo proceed to their work together discussing K's secrets.

Men in Black: International
Agent J does not appear in Men in Black: International, but makes a cameo in a painting in High-T's office.

Other
In Waiting in the Summer, Agent J doesn't appear, but is often referred by Ichika Takatsuki with fear of being captured by him.

See also
 Agent K
 The Men in Black (comics), inspiration for the fictional characters and stories

References

Notes
 Chronological mistake: In Men in Black (1997 film) while Kay is deleting his identity, his date of birth is shown as October 19, 1969.

External links

 
 

Men in Black (franchise)
Animated human characters
Black characters in films
Film characters introduced in 1997
Fictional African-American people
Fictional alien hunters
Fictional code names
Fictional members of secret societies
Fictional paranormal investigators
Fictional New York City Police Department detectives
Fictional police officers in films
Fictional police officers in television
Fictional secret agents and spies in films
Fictional secret agents and spies in television
Malibu Comics characters
Sony Pictures characters